Fly ash, flue ash, coal ash, or pulverised fuel ash (in the UK) plurale tantum: coal combustion residuals (CCRs)is a coal combustion product that is composed of the particulates (fine particles of burned fuel) that are driven out of coal-fired boilers together with the flue gases. Ash that falls to the bottom of the boiler's combustion chamber (commonly called a firebox) is called bottom ash. In modern coal-fired power plants, fly ash is generally captured by electrostatic precipitators or other particle filtration equipment before the flue gases reach the chimneys. Together with bottom ash removed from the bottom of the boiler, it is known as coal ash.

Depending upon the source and composition of the coal being burned, the components of fly ash vary considerably, but all fly ash includes substantial amounts of silicon dioxide (SiO2) (both amorphous and crystalline), aluminium oxide (Al2O3) and calcium oxide (CaO), the main mineral compounds in coal-bearing rock strata.

The use of fly ash as a lightweight aggregate (LWA) offers a valuable opportunity to recycle one of the largest waste streams in the US. In addition, fly ash can offer many benefits, both economically and environmentally when utilized as a LWA. 

The minor constituents of fly ash depend upon the specific coal bed composition but may include one or more of the following elements or compounds found in trace concentrations (up to hundreds ppm): gallium, arsenic, beryllium, boron, cadmium, chromium, hexavalent chromium, cobalt, lead, manganese, mercury, molybdenum, selenium, strontium, thallium, and vanadium, along with very small concentrations of dioxins and PAH compounds. It also has unburnt carbon.

In the past, fly ash was generally released into the atmosphere, but air pollution control standards now require that it be captured prior to release by fitting pollution control equipment. In the United States, fly ash is generally stored at coal power plants or placed in landfills. About 43% is recycled, often used as a pozzolan to produce hydraulic cement or hydraulic plaster and a replacement or partial replacement for Portland cement in concrete production. Pozzolans ensure the setting of concrete and plaster and provide concrete with more protection from wet conditions and chemical attack.

In the case that fly (or bottom) ash is not produced from coal, for example when solid waste is incinerated in a waste-to-energy facility to produce electricity, the ash may contain higher levels of contaminants than coal ash. In that case the ash produced is often classified as hazardous waste.

Chemical composition and classification

Fly ash material solidifies while suspended in the exhaust gases and is collected by electrostatic precipitators or filter bags. Since the particles solidify rapidly while suspended in the exhaust gases, fly ash particles are generally spherical in shape and range in size from 0.5 µm to 300 µm. The major consequence of the rapid cooling is that few minerals have time to crystallize, and that mainly amorphous, quenched glass remains. Nevertheless, some refractory phases in the pulverized coal do not melt (entirely), and remain crystalline. In consequence, fly ash is a heterogeneous material.

SiO2, Al2O3, Fe2O3 and occasionally CaO are the main chemical components present in fly ashes. The mineralogy of fly ashes is very diverse. The main phases encountered are a glass phase, together with quartz, mullite and the iron oxides hematite, magnetite and/or maghemite. Other phases often identified are cristobalite, anhydrite, free lime, periclase, calcite, sylvite, halite, portlandite, rutile and anatase. The Ca-bearing minerals anorthite, gehlenite, akermanite and various calcium silicates and calcium aluminates identical to those found in Portland cement can be identified in Ca-rich fly ashes.
The mercury content can reach , but is generally included in the range 0.01–1 ppm for bituminous coal.
The concentrations of other trace elements vary as well according to the kind of coal combusted to form it.

Classification 
Two classes of fly ash are defined by American Society for Testing and Materials (ASTM) C618: Class F fly ash and Class C fly ash. The chief difference between these classes is the amount of calcium, silica, alumina, and iron content in the ash. The chemical properties of the fly ash are largely influenced by the chemical content of the coal burned (i.e., anthracite, bituminous, and lignite).

Not all fly ashes meet ASTM C618 requirements, although depending on the application, this may not be necessary. Fly ash used as a cement replacement must meet strict construction standards, but no standard environmental regulations have been established in the United States. Seventy-five percent of the fly ash must have a fineness of 45 µm or less, and have a carbon content, measured by the loss on ignition (LOI), of less than 4%. In the US, LOI must be under 6%. The particle size distribution of raw fly ash tends to fluctuate constantly, due to changing performance of the coal mills and the boiler performance. This makes it necessary that, if fly ash is used in an optimal way to replace cement in concrete production, it must be processed using beneficiation methods like mechanical air classification. But if fly ash is used as a filler to replace sand in concrete production, unbeneficiated fly ash with higher LOI can be also used. Especially important is the ongoing quality verification. This is mainly expressed by quality control seals like the Bureau of Indian Standards mark or the DCL mark of the Dubai Municipality.

Class "F"
The burning of harder, older anthracite and bituminous coal typically produces Class F fly ash. This fly ash is pozzolanic in nature, and contains less than 7% lime (CaO). Possessing pozzolanic properties, the glassy silica and alumina of Class F fly ash requires a cementing agent, such as Portland cement, quicklime, or hydrated lime—mixed with water to react and produce cementitious compounds. Alternatively, adding a chemical activator such as sodium silicate (water glass) to a Class F ash can form a geopolymer.

Class "C"
Fly ash produced from the burning of younger lignite or sub-bituminous coal, in addition to having pozzolanic properties, also has some self-cementing properties. In the presence of water, Class C fly ash hardens and gets stronger over time. Class C fly ash generally contains more than 20% lime (CaO). Unlike Class F, self-cementing Class C fly ash does not require an activator. Alkali and sulfate contents are generally higher in Class C fly ashes.

At least one US manufacturer has announced a fly ash brick containing up to 50% Class C fly ash. Testing shows bricks meet or exceed the performance standards listed in ASTM C 216 for conventional clay brick. It is also within the allowable shrinkage limits for concrete brick in ASTM C 55, Standard Specification for Concrete Building Brick. It is estimated that the production method used in fly ash bricks will reduce the embodied energy of masonry construction by up to 90%. Bricks and pavers were expected to be available in commercial quantities before the end of 2009.

Disposal and market sources
In the past, fly ash produced from coal combustion was simply entrained in flue gases and dispersed into the atmosphere. This created environmental and health concerns that prompted laws in heavily industrialized countries that have reduced fly ash emissions to less than 1% of ash produced. Worldwide, more than 65% of fly ash produced from coal power stations is disposed of in landfills and ash ponds.

Ash that is stored or deposited outdoors can eventually leach toxic compounds into underground water aquifers. For this reason, much of the current debate around fly ash disposal revolves around creating specially lined landfills that prevent the chemical compounds from being leached into the ground water and local ecosystems.

Since coal was the dominant energy source in the United States for many decades, power companies often located their coal plants near metropolitan areas. Compounding the environmental issues, the coal plants need significant amounts of water to operate their boilers, leading coal plants (and later their fly ash storage basins) to be located near metropolitan areas and near rivers and lakes which are often used as drinking supplies by nearby cities. Many of those fly ash basins were unlined and also at great risk of spilling and flooding from nearby rivers and lakes.  For example, Duke Energy in North Carolina has been involved in several major lawsuits related to its coal ash storage and spills into the leakage of ash into the water basin.

The recycling of fly ash has become an increasing concern in recent years due to increasing landfill costs and current interest in sustainable development. Environmental benefits to recycling fly ash includes reducing the demand for virgin materials that would need quarrying and cheap substitution for materials such as Portland cement.

Reuse
There is no US governmental registration or labelling of fly ash utilization in the different sectors of the economy – industry, infrastructures and agriculture. Fly ash utilization survey data, acknowledged as incomplete, are published annually by the American Coal Ash Association.

Coal ash uses include (approximately in order of decreasing importance):
 Concrete production, as a substitute material for Portland cement, sand.
Corrosion control in RC structures 
 Fly-ash pellets which can replace normal aggregate in concrete mixture.
 Embankments and other structural fills (usually for road construction)
 Grout and Flowable fill production
 Waste stabilization and solidification
 Cement clinker production (as a substitute material for clay)
 Mine reclamation
 Stabilization of soft soils
 Road subbase construction
 As aggregate substitute material (e.g. for brick production) 
 Mineral filler in asphaltic concrete
 Agricultural uses: soil amendment, fertilizer, cattle feeders, soil stabilization in stock feed yards, and agricultural stakes
 Loose application on rivers to melt ice
 Loose application on roads and parking lots for ice control

Other applications include cosmetics, toothpaste, kitchen counter tops, floor and ceiling tiles, bowling balls, flotation devices, stucco, utensils, tool handles, picture frames, auto bodies and boat hulls, cellular concrete, geopolymers, roofing tiles, roofing granules, decking, fireplace mantles, cinder block, PVC pipe, structural insulated panels, house siding and trim, running tracks, blasting grit, recycled plastic lumber, utility poles and crossarms, railway sleepers, highway noise barriers, marine pilings, doors, window frames, scaffolding, sign posts, crypts, columns, railroad ties, vinyl flooring, paving stones, shower stalls, garage doors, park benches, landscape timbers, planters, pallet blocks, molding, mail boxes, artificial reef, binding agent, paints and undercoatings, metal castings, and filler in wood and plastic products.

Portland cement
Owing to its pozzolanic properties, fly ash is used as a replacement for Portland cement in concrete. The use of fly ash as a pozzolanic ingredient was recognized as early as 1914, although the earliest noteworthy study of its use was in 1937. Roman structures such as aqueducts or the Pantheon in Rome used volcanic ash or pozzolana (which possesses similar properties to fly ash) as pozzolan in their concrete. As pozzolan greatly improves the strength and durability of concrete, the use of ash is a key factor in their preservation.

Use of fly ash as a partial replacement for Portland cement is particularly suitable but not limited to Class C fly ashes.  Class "F" fly ashes can have volatile effects on the entrained air content of concrete, causing reduced resistance to freeze/thaw damage. Fly ash often replaces up to 30% by mass of Portland cement, but can be used in higher dosages in certain applications. In some cases, fly ash can add to the concrete's final strength and increase its chemical resistance and durability.

Fly ash can significantly improve the workability of concrete. Recently, techniques have been developed to replace partial cement with high-volume fly ash (50% cement replacement). For roller-compacted concrete (RCC)[used in dam construction], replacement values of 70% have been achieved with processed fly ash at the Ghatghar dam project in Maharashtra, India. Due to the spherical shape of fly ash particles, it can increase workability of cement while reducing water demand. Proponents of fly ash claim that replacing Portland cement with fly ash reduces the greenhouse gas "footprint" of concrete, as the production of one ton of Portland cement generates approximately one ton of CO2, compared to no CO2 generated with fly ash. New fly ash production, i.e., the burning of coal, produces approximately 20 to 30 tons of CO2 per ton of fly ash. Since the worldwide production of Portland cement is expected to reach nearly 2 billion tons by 2010, replacement of any large portion of this cement by fly ash could significantly reduce carbon emissions associated with construction, as long as the comparison takes the production of fly ash as a given.

Embankment
Fly ash properties are unusual among engineering materials. Unlike soils typically used for embankment construction, fly ash has a large uniformity coefficient and it consists of clay-sized particles. Engineering properties that affect the use of fly ash in embankments include grain size distribution, compaction characteristics, shear strength, compressibility, permeability, and frost susceptibility. Nearly all the types of fly ash used in embankments are Class F.

Soil stabilization
Soil stabilization is the permanent physical and chemical alteration of soils to enhance their physical properties. Stabilization can increase the shear strength of a soil and/or control the shrink-swell properties of a soil, thus improving the load-bearing capacity of a sub-grade to support pavements and foundations. Stabilization can be used to treat a wide range of sub-grade materials from expansive clays to granular materials. Stabilization can be achieved with a variety of chemical additives including lime, fly ash, and Portland cement. Proper design and testing is an important component of any stabilization project. This allows for the establishment of design criteria, and determination of the proper chemical additive and admixture rate that achieves the desired engineering properties. Stabilization process benefits can include: Higher resistance (R) values, Reduction in plasticity, Lower permeability, Reduction of pavement thickness, Elimination of excavation – material hauling/handling – and base importation, Aids compaction, Provides "all-weather" access onto and within projects sites. Another form of soil treatment closely related to soil stabilization is soil modification, sometimes referred to as "mud drying" or soil conditioning. Although some stabilization inherently occurs in soil modification, the distinction is that soil modification is merely a means to reduce the moisture content of a soil to expedite construction, whereas stabilization can substantially increase the shear strength of a material such that it can be incorporated into the project's structural design. The determining factors associated with soil modification vs soil stabilization may be the existing moisture content, the end use of the soil structure and ultimately the cost benefit provided. Equipment for the stabilization and modification processes include: chemical additive spreaders, soil mixers (reclaimers), portable pneumatic storage containers, water trucks, deep lift compactors, motor graders.

Flowable fill
Fly ash is also used as a component in the production of flowable fill (also called controlled low strength material, or CLSM), which is used as self-leveling, self-compact backfill material in lieu of compacted earth or granular fill. The strength of flowable fill mixes can range from 50 to 1,200 lbf/in2 (0.3 to 8.3 MPa), depending on the design requirements of the project in question. Flowable fill includes mixtures of Portland cement and filler material, and can contain mineral admixtures. Fly ash can replace either the Portland cement or fine aggregate (in most cases, river sand) as a filler material. High fly ash content mixes contain nearly all fly ash, with a small percentage of Portland cement and enough water to make the mix flowable. Low fly ash content mixes contain a high percentage of filler material, and a low percentage of fly ash, Portland cement, and water. Class F fly ash is best suited for high fly ash content mixes, whereas Class C fly ash is almost always used in low fly ash content mixes.

Asphalt concrete
Asphalt concrete is a composite material consisting of an asphalt binder and mineral aggregate commonly used to surface roads. Both Class F and Class C fly ash can typically be used as a mineral filler to fill the voids and provide contact points between larger aggregate particles in asphalt concrete mixes. This application is used in conjunction, or as a replacement for, other binders (such as Portland cement or hydrated lime). For use in asphalt pavement, the fly ash must meet mineral filler specifications outlined in ASTM D242. The hydrophobic nature of fly ash gives pavements better resistance to stripping. Fly ash has also been shown to increase the stiffness of the asphalt matrix, improving rutting resistance and increasing mix durability.

Filler for thermoplastics
Coal and shale oil fly ashes have been used as a filler for thermoplastics that could be used for injection molding applications.

Geopolymers
More recently, fly ash has been used as a component in geopolymers, where the reactivity of the fly ash glasses can be used to create a binder similar to a hydrated Portland cement in appearance, but with potentially superior properties, including reduced CO2 emissions, depending on the formulation.

Roller compacted concrete

Another application of using fly ash is in roller compacted concrete dams. Many dams in the US have been constructed with high fly ash contents. Fly ash lowers the heat of hydration allowing thicker placements to occur. Data for these can be found at the US Bureau of Reclamation. This has also been demonstrated in the Ghatghar Dam Project in India.

Bricks 
There are several techniques for manufacturing construction bricks from fly ash, producing a wide variety of products. One type of fly ash brick is manufactured by mixing fly ash with an equal amount of clay, then firing in a kiln at about   This approach has the principal benefit of reducing the amount of clay required. Another type of fly ash brick is made by mixing soil, plaster of Paris, fly ash and water, and allowing the mixture to dry. Because no heat is required, this technique reduces air pollution. More modern manufacturing processes use a greater proportion of fly ash, and a high pressure manufacturing technique, which produces high strength bricks with environmental benefits.

In the United Kingdom, fly ash has been used for over fifty years to make concrete building blocks. They are widely used for the inner skin of cavity walls. They are naturally more thermally insulating than blocks made with other aggregates. 

Ash bricks have been used in house construction in Windhoek, Namibia, since the 1970s. There is, however, a problem with the bricks in that they tend to fail or produce unsightly pop-outs. This happens when the bricks come into contact with moisture and a chemical reaction occurs causing the bricks to expand. 

In India, fly ash bricks are used for construction. Leading manufacturers use an industrial standard known as "Pulverized fuel ash for lime-Pozzolana mixture" using over 75% post-industrial recycled waste, and a compression process. This produces a strong product with good insulation properties and environmental benefits.

Metal matrix composites
Fly ash particles have proved their potential as good reinforcement with aluminum alloys and show the improvement of physical and mechanical properties. In particular, the compression strength, tensile strength, and hardness increase when the percentage of fly ash content is increased, whereas the density decreases. The presence of fly ash cenospheres in a pure Al matrix decreases its coefficient of thermal expansion (CTE).

Mineral extraction
It may be possible to use vacuum distillation in order to extract germanium and tungsten from fly ash and recycle them.

Waste treatment and stabilization
Fly ash, in view of its alkalinity and water absorption capacity, may be used in combination with other alkaline materials to transform sewage sludge into organic fertilizer or biofuel.

Catalyst
Fly ash, when treated with sodium hydroxide, appears to function well as a catalyst for converting polyethylene into substance similar to crude oil in a high-temperature process called pyrolysis and utilized in waste water treatment.

In addition, fly ash, mainly class C, may be used in the stabilization/solidification process of hazardous wastes and contaminated soils. For example, the Rhenipal process uses fly ash as an admixture to stabilize sewage sludge and other toxic sludges. This process has been used since 1996 to stabilize large amounts of chromium(VI) contaminated leather sludges in Alcanena, Portugal.

Environmental problems

Groundwater contamination
Coal contains trace levels of trace elements (such as arsenic, barium, beryllium, boron, cadmium, chromium, thallium, selenium, molybdenum and mercury), many of which are highly toxic to humans and other life. Therefore, fly ash obtained after combustion of this coal contains enhanced concentrations of these elements and the potential of the ash to cause groundwater pollution is significant. In the USA there are documented cases of groundwater pollution that followed ash disposal or utilization without the necessary protection having been put in place.

Examples

Maryland
Constellation Energy disposed fly ash generated by its Brandon Shores Generating Station at a former sand and gravel mine in Gambrills, Maryland, during 1996 to 2007. The ash contaminated groundwater with heavy metals. The Maryland Department of the Environment issued a fine of $1 million to Constellation. Nearby residents filed a lawsuit against Constellation and in 2008 the company settled the case for $54 million.

North Carolina
In 2014, residents living near the Buck Steam Station in Dukeville, North Carolina, were told that "coal ash pits near their homes could be leaching dangerous materials into groundwater."

Illinois
Illinois has many coal ash dumpsites with coal ash generated by coal-burning electric power plants. Of the state's 24 coal ash dumpsites with available data, 22 have released toxic pollutants including arsenic, cobalt, and lithium, into groundwater, rivers and lakes. The hazardous toxic chemicals dumped into the water in Illinois by these coal ash dumpsites include more than 300,000 pounds of aluminum, 600 pounds of arsenic, nearly 300,000 pounds of boron, over 200 pounds of cadmium, over 15,000 pounds of manganese, roughly 1,500 pounds of selenium, roughly 500,000 pounds of nitrogen, and nearly 40 million pounds of sulfate, according to a report by the Environmental Integrity Project, Earthjustice, the Prairie Rivers Network, and the Sierra Club.

Tennessee

In 2008, the Kingston Fossil Plant in Roane County spilled 1.1 billion gallons of coal ash into the Emory and Clinch Rivers and damaged nearby residential areas. It is the largest industrial spill in the U.S.

Texas 
Groundwater surrounding every single one of the 16 coal-burning power plants in Texas has been polluted by coal ash, according to a study by the Environmental Integrity Project (EIP). Unsafe levels of arsenic, cobalt, lithium, and other contaminants were found in the groundwater near all the ash dump sites. At 12 of the 16 sites, the EIP analysis found levels of arsenic in the groundwater 10 times higher than the EPA Maximum Contaminant Level; arsenic has been found to cause several types of cancer. At 10 of the sites, lithium, which causes neurological disease, was found in the groundwater at concentrations more than 1,000 micrograms per liter, which is 25 times the maximum acceptable level. The report concludes that the fossil fuel industry in Texas has failed to comply with federal regulations on coal ash processing, and state regulators have failed to protect the groundwater.

Ecology 
The effect of fly ash on the environment can vary based on the thermal power plant where it is produced, as well as the proportion of fly ash to bottom ash in the waste product. This is due to the different chemical make-up of the coal based on the geology of the area the coal is found and the burning process of the coal in the power plant. When the coal is combusted, it creates an alkaline dust. This alkaline dust can have a pH ranging from 8 to as high as 12. Fly ash dust can be deposited on topsoil increasing the pH and affecting the plants and animals in the surrounding ecosystem. Trace elements, such as, iron, manganese, zinc, copper, lead, nickel, chromium, cobalt, arsenic, cadmium, and mercury, can be found at higher concentrations compared to bottom ash and the parent coal.

Fly ash can leach toxic constituents that can be anywhere from one hundred to one thousand times greater than the federal standard for drinking water. Fly ash can contaminate surface water through erosion, surface runoff, airborne particles landing on the water surface, contaminated ground water moving into surface waters, flooding drainage, or discharge from a coal ash pond. Fish can be contaminated a couple of different ways. When the water is contaminated by fly ash, the fish can absorb the toxins through their gills. The sediment in the water can also become contaminated. The contaminated sediment can contaminate the food sources for the fish, the fish can then become contaminated from consuming those food sources. This can then lead to contamination of organisms that consume these fish, such as, birds, bear, and even humans. Once exposed to fly ash contaminating the water, aquatic organisms have had increased levels of calcium, zinc, bromine, gold, cerium, chromium, selenium, cadmium, and mercury.

Soils contaminated by fly ash showed an increase in bulk density and water capacity, but a decrease in hydraulic conductivity and cohesiveness. The effect of fly ash on soils and microorganisms in the soils are influenced by the pH of the ash and trace metal concentrations in the ash. Microbial communities in contaminated soil have shown reductions in respiration and nitrification. These contaminated soils can be detrimental or beneficial to plant development. Fly ash typically has beneficial outcomes when it corrects nutrient deficiencies in the soil. Most detrimental effects were observed when boron phytotoxicity was observed. Plants absorb elements elevated by the fly ash from the soil. Arsenic, molybdenum, and selenium were the only elements found at potentially toxic levels for grazing animals. Terrestrial organisms exposed to fly ash only showed increased levels of selenium.

Spills of bulk storage 

Where fly ash is stored in bulk, it is usually stored wet rather than dry to minimize fugitive dust. The resulting impoundments (ponds) are typically large and stable for long periods, but any breach of their dams or bunding is rapid and on a massive scale.

In December 2008, the collapse of an embankment at an impoundment for wet storage of fly ash at the Tennessee Valley Authority's Kingston Fossil Plant caused a major release of 5.4 million cubic yards of coal fly ash, damaging three homes and flowing into the Emory River. Cleanup costs may exceed $1.2 billion. This spill was followed a few weeks later by a smaller TVA-plant spill in Alabama, which contaminated Widows Creek and the Tennessee River.

In 2014, 39,000 tons of ash and 27 million gallons (100,000 cubic meters) of contaminated water spilled into the Dan River near Eden, NC from a closed North Carolina coal-fired power plant that is owned by Duke Energy. It is currently the third worst coal ash spill ever to happen in the United States.

The U.S. Environmental Protection Agency (EPA) published a Coal Combustion Residuals (CCR) regulation in 2015. The agency continued to classify coal ash as non-hazardous (thereby avoiding strict permitting requirements under Subtitle C of the Resource Conservation and Recovery Act (RCRA), but with new restrictions:
 Existing ash ponds that are contaminating groundwater must stop receiving CCR, and close or retrofit with a liner.
 Existing ash ponds and landfills must comply with structural and location restrictions, where applicable, or close.
 A pond no longer receiving CCR is still subject to all regulations unless it is dewatered and covered by 2018.
 New ponds and landfills must include a geomembrane liner over a layer of compacted soil.
The regulation was designed to prevent pond failures and protect groundwater. Enhanced inspection, record keeping and monitoring is required. Procedures for closure are also included and include capping, liners, and dewatering. The CCR regulation has since been subject to litigation.

Contaminants 
Fly ash contains trace concentrations of heavy metals and other substances that are known to be detrimental to health in sufficient quantities. Potentially toxic trace elements in coal include arsenic, beryllium, cadmium, barium, chromium, copper, lead, mercury, molybdenum, nickel, radium, selenium, thorium, uranium, vanadium, and zinc. Approximately 10% of the mass of coals burned in the United States consists of unburnable mineral material that becomes ash, so the concentration of most trace elements in coal ash is approximately 10 times the concentration in the original coal. A 1997 analysis by the United States Geological Survey (USGS) found that fly ash typically contained 10 to 30 ppm of uranium, comparable to the levels found in some granitic rocks, phosphate rock, and black shale.

In 1980 the U.S. Congress defined coal ash as a "special waste" that would not be regulated under the stringent hazardous waste permitting requirements of RCRA. In its amendments to RCRA, Congress directed EPA to study the special waste issue and make a determination as to whether stricter permit regulation was necessary. In 2000, EPA stated that coal fly ash did not need to be regulated as a hazardous waste. As a result, most power plants were not required to install geomembranes or leachate collection systems in ash ponds.

Studies by the USGS and others of radioactive elements in coal ash have concluded that fly ash compares with common soils or rocks and should not be the source of alarm. However, community and environmental organizations have documented numerous environmental contamination and damage concerns.

Exposure concerns

Crystalline silica and lime along with toxic chemicals represent exposure risks to human health and the environment. Fly ash contains crystalline silica which is known to cause lung disease, in particular silicosis, if inhaled. Crystalline silica is listed by the IARC and US National Toxicology Program as a known human carcinogen.

Lime (CaO) reacts with water (H2O) to form calcium hydroxide [Ca(OH)2], giving fly ash a pH somewhere between 10 and 12, a medium to strong base. This can also cause lung damage if present in sufficient quantities.

Material Safety Data Sheets recommend a number of safety precautions be taken when handling or working with fly ash. These include wearing protective goggles, respirators and disposable clothing and avoiding agitating the fly ash in order to minimize the amount which becomes airborne.

The National Academy of Sciences noted in 2007 that "the presence of high contaminant levels in many CCR (coal combustion residue) leachates may create human health and ecological concerns".

Regulation

United States 
Following the 2008 Kingston Fossil Plant coal fly ash slurry spill, EPA began developing regulations that would apply to all ash ponds nationwide. EPA published the CCR rule in 2015. Some of the provisions in the 2015 CCR regulation were challenged in litigation, and the United States Court of Appeals for the District of Columbia Circuit remanded certain portions of the regulation to EPA for further rulemaking.

EPA published a proposed rule on August 14, 2019, that would use location-based criteria, rather than a numerical threshold (i.e. impoundment or landfill size) that would require an operator to demonstrate minimal environmental impact so that a site could remain in operation.

In response to the court remand, EPA published its "CCR Part A" final rule on August 28, 2020 requiring all unlined ash ponds to retrofit with liners or close by April 11, 2021. Some facilities may apply to obtain additional time—up to 2028—to find alternatives for managing ash wastes before closing their surface impoundments. EPA published its "CCR Part B" rule on November 12, 2020, which allows certain facilities to use an alternative liner, based on a demonstration that human health and the environment will not be affected. Further litigation on the CCR regulation is pending as of 2021.

In October 2020 EPA published a final effluent guidelines rule that reverses some provisions of its 2015 regulation, which had tightened requirements on toxic metals in wastewater discharged from ash ponds and other power plant wastestreams. The 2020 rule has also been challenged in litigation. In August 2021 EPA announced that it is conducting another rulemaking to address the 2020 rule and strengthen wastewater limitations. The agency plans to publish a proposed rule in fall 2022.

India 
The Ministry of Environment, Forest and Climate Change of India first published a gazette notification in 1999 specifying use of fly ash and mandating a target date for all thermal power plants to comply by ensuring 100% utilisation. Subsequent amendments in 2003 and 2009 shifted the deadline for compliance to 2014. As reported by Central Electricity Authority, New Delhi, as of 2015, only 60% of fly ash produced was being utilised. This has resulted in the latest notification in 2015 which has set December 31, 2017, as the revised deadline to achieve 100% utilisation. Out of the approximately 55.7% fly ash utilised, bulk of it (42.3%) goes into cement production whereas only about 0.74% is used as an additive in concrete (See Table 5 [29]). Researchers in India are actively addressing this challenge by working on fly ash as an admixture for concrete and activated pozzolanic cement such as geopolymer [34] to help achieve the target of 100% utilisation. The biggest scope clearly lies in the area of increasing the quantity of fly ash being incorporated in concrete. India produced 280 Million Tonnes of Cement in 2016 . With housing sector consuming 67% of the cement, there is a huge scope for incorporating fly ash in both the increasing share of PPC and low to moderate strength concrete. There is a misconception that the Indian codes IS 456:2000 for Concrete and Reinforced Concrete and IS 3812.1:2013 for Fly Ash restrict the use of Fly Ash to less than 35%. Similar misconceptions exists in countries like USA but evidence to the contrary is the use of HVFA in many large projects where design mixes have been used under strict quality control. It is suggested that in order to make the most of the research results presented in the paper, Ultra High Volume Fly ash Concrete (UHVFA) concrete is urgently developed for widespread use in India using local fly ash. Urgent steps are also required to promote alkali activated pozzolan or geopolymer cement based concretes.

In the geologic record 
Due to the ignition of coal deposits by the Siberian Traps during the Permian–Triassic extinction event around 252 million years ago, large amounts of char very similar to modern fly ash were released into the oceans, which is preserved in the geologic record in marine deposits located in the Canadian High Arctic. It has been hypothesised that the fly ash could have resulted in toxic environmental conditions.

See also

 Alkali–silica reaction (ASR)
 Alkali–aggregate reaction
 Cement
 Coal waste
 Energetically modified cement (EMC)
 Health effects of coal ash
 Pozzolanic reaction
 Silica fume
 Cenocell

References

External links 

 Evaluation of Dust Exposures at Lehigh Portland Cement Company, Union Bridge, MD, a NIOSH Report, HETA 2000-0309-2857
 Determination of Airborne Crystalline Silica Treatise by NIOSH
 American Coal Ash Association
 Fly Ash Info, the Ash Library Website, University of Kentucky
 United States Geological Survey – Radioactive Elements in Coal and Fly Ash (document)
 Public Employees for Environmental Responsibility: Coal Combustion Waste
 UK Quality Ash Association : A site promoting the many uses of fly ash in the UK
 Coal Ash Is More Radioactive than Nuclear Waste, Scientific American (13 December 2007)
 UK Quality Ash Association A web site providing further information on the applications for PFA.
 Asian Coal Ash Association A web site providing further information on technologies and trade related to coal combustion products.

Cement
Coal
Coal-fired power stations
Concrete
Environmental impact of the coal industry
Environmental impact of the energy industry
Silicates
Waste
Waste treatment technology
Types of ash
By-products